Jane Blankenship won high science honors while at Oak Ridge High School before graduating in June 1958 from the University of Tennessee, Knoxville with a B.S. in chemistry. She worked summers at Oak Ridge National Laboratory, where her father Dr. Forest F. Blankenship was a physical chemist, and then married Carl H. Gibson, a chemical engineer, and became employed as a spectroscopist for Lockheed Aircraft in Palo Alto, California.

Biography
Jane Carruth Blankenship and twin sister Elizabeth Ann Blankenship were born on 20 June 1936 in Lamar, Texas to Forrest Farle Blankenship and Margaret Berry Burke.

According to the 1940 U.S. Census, the Blankenship family resided in Lamar, Texas. Forest F. Blankenship, head of household, age 26, worked as a teacher in a public school and reported an annual income of $1800. Margrett Blankenship, her mother, age 29, did not report income or employment. Jane C. Blankenship, age 3, had a twin sister, Elizabeth A. Blankenship, age 3.

Jane Blankenship married Carl Gibson on 28 May 1958 at Roane County, Tennessee.

National attention
In 1961, a news story was written regarding “sex desegregation” in the sciences and a photograph of her was utilized to illustrate the critical significance of inspiring women to pursue careers in science.

As of 2008 Professor David Kaiser of the Massachusetts Institute of Technology began offering a graduate level course titled “Cold War Science” that discussed the role women featured during the Cold War and included Jane Blankenship Gibson as an example.

Thesis
Rotational Analysis of the 0-0 Band of the B2 Σ U -> X2 Σ g Transition of N+ 2 from Shock Tube Spectra.

Selected publications
Gibson, J. B., Goland, A. N., Milgram, M., & Vineyard, G. (1960). Dynamics of radiation damage. Physical Review, 120(4), 1229.
Gibson, J. B., Goland, A. N., & Milgram, M. (1960). The Nature of Radiation Damage in FCC Metals 265 GH Vineyard. Phys. Rev. O, 12, 1229.
Gibson, J. A. B. (1961). Liquid Scintillation Counting of Tritium in Urine. Physics in medicine and biology, 6(1), 55.
Gibson, J. A. B. (1961). Detection of Tritium with a Film Dosemeter. Physics in Medicine and Biology, 6(2), 283.
Gibson, Jane Blankenship. (1962). Rotational Analysis of the 0-0 Band of the B2 [sigma Subscript U]-> X2 [sigma] g Transition of N+ 2 from Shock Tube Spectra. Physical Sciences Program, Stanford University.
Gibson, J. A. B. (1962). Measurement of the Gamma Radiation Background (No. AERE-R-4137). United Kingdom Atomic Energy Authority. Research Group. Atomic Energy Research Establishment, Harwell, Berks, England.
Gibson, J. A. B. (1962). Gamma radiation background measurements - instrument selection. 1962.

References

American chemists
Spectroscopists
Oak Ridge National Laboratory people
University of Tennessee alumni
People from Oak Ridge, Tennessee
1936 births
People from Lamar County, Texas
Stanford University alumni
Lockheed Martin people
Living people